The 2017 UCI Road World Championships were held in 2017 in Bergen, Norway. It was the 90th UCI Road World Championships and the second to be held in Norway, after the 1993 world championships in Oslo. Chantal Blaak of the Netherlands won the women's road race and Peter Sagan of Slovakia won the men's road race. Sagan became the first man to win three successive world road race championships.

Bidding process
It was announced on 25 September 2014 following a two-day meeting held in conjunction with the 2014 UCI Road World Championships in Ponferrada, Spain, that Bergen was elected to host the Championships in 2017. The city was chosen over Innsbruck (Austria), Melbourne (Australia) and Bogotá (Colombia).

Bergen sent in their application by 1 January 2014. By that time they had put eighteen months of planning into the event. The total budget for the event is said to be 156 million Norwegian kroner. Of this, 58 million kroner are earmarked to be paid to the UCI as an organising fee. The Norwegian federation president Harald Tiedemann Hansen ruled out paying more than that. Norway had unsuccessfully bid for the 2016 World Championships.

Schedule
All times are in CEST (UTC+2).

Events summary

Elite events

Under-23 events

Junior events

Medal table

References

External links

 
 Event page at UCI.ch

 
UCI Road World Championships by year
World Championships
International cycle races hosted by Norway
2017 in Norwegian sport
Sports competitions in Bergen
21st century in Bergen
September 2017 sports events in Europe